Zanha is a small genus of plants in the family Sapindaceae, native to Africa.

Species include:
 Zanha africana (Radlk.) Exell
Zanha golungensis Hiern
Zanha suaveolens Capuron

References

Dodonaeoideae
Sapindaceae genera